The Christina River is located in the Wood Buffalo region of north-eastern Alberta, Canada. The Christina is a tributary of the Clearwater River and was named to honour Christine Gordon, who was the first white women to live permanently in the Fort McMurray area.

Course and drainage basin
The Christina River arises close to Christina Lake near the town of Conklin and is part of Christina Lake's  drainage basin. Christina Lake's waters reach the Christina River via the short ( long) Jackfish River. The waters eventually reach the Arctic Ocean via the Athabasca and MacKenzie Rivers.

History
The Christina River and Christina Lake were named to honour Christine Gordon, originally from Scotland, who was the first white woman to live permanently in the Fort McMurray area, where she remained until her death in the 1940s. She was highly respected by the community, including the First Nations and Métis. Gordon, partly based on knowledge gleaned from a Scottish home nursing book, made her own treatments for illnesses and injuries. She could "splint a broken arm, lower a fever, and mix herbal remedies." By 1914 she owned and operated a post in Fort McMurray, in competition with the Hudson's Bay Company.

Notes

See also
List of rivers of Alberta
oil sands

References

External links
 Clearwater River Provincial Park

Regional Municipality of Wood Buffalo
Rivers of Alberta
Canadian Heritage Rivers